Hrvatska poštanska banka d.d. or HPB is the largest Croatian-owned bank in the country and ranks 6th in Croatia in terms of total assets, worth around HRK 21.25 billion.

The bank was founded in October 1991 by Hrvatska pošta, the Croatian national postal service, which was the bank's majority shareholder until 2001. Since 2001, the Government of Croatia is the majority owner of the bank, via stakes acquired by the state-owned fund Hrvatski fond za privatizaciju and the national pension fund Hrvatski zavod za mirovinsko osiguranje. HPB is listed on the Zagreb Stock Exchange.

In November 2019, the International Banker awarded Hrvatska poštanska banka as the best commercial bank of the year in Croatia. In March 2020, HPB decided to retain 2019 net profit, accepting a resolution of the Croatia's central bank.

In September 2021, the supervisory board of HPB appointed Marko Badurina as President of the HPB Management Board, and Anto Mihaljević and Ivan Soldo as Members of the management board. The CNB Council approved the propositions.

In March 2022, the EU unit of Sberbank went into insolvency (due to the EU sanctions in reaction to the 2022 Russian invasion of Ukraine and the Single Resolution Board decided to transfer all shares of the Sberbank's Croatian subsidiary to HPB. On the 2nd of March, HPB officially bought the local unit of Sberbank for 71 million kuna (€9.4 million euro).

Ownership structure
Republic of Croatia (42.4293%)
Croatian Post (11.9336%)
State Agency for Deposit Insurance and Bank Resolution	(8.9803%)
Croatian Pension Insurance Institute (8.7577%)
Hrvatska poštanska banka PLC – treasury shares (0.0393%)
Other shareholders (each under 5% of share of the equity capital) (27.8597%)

References

External links
 

Banks established in 1991
Banks of Croatia
Companies listed on the Zagreb Stock Exchange
1991 establishments in Croatia
Government-owned companies of Croatia
Banks based in Zagreb
Postal savings system